Ezinu is a large crater on Ceres, located within the Hanami Planum. It was officially named in 2015 by the IAU after a Sumerian goddess of grain.

Physical features
The floor of Ezinu is home to a series of fractures, which are up to 200 metres deep and stretch for 22.7 km. These fractures were theorised in a 2018 study to have been formed as a result of subsurface low-viscosity material flowing into the crater.

References

Impact craters on asteroids
Surface features of Ceres